Magomed Shakhbanovich Omarov (born 16 October 16, 1989) is a Russian Super Heavyweight amateur boxer best known to win the 2011 European Amateur Boxing Championships.
He also qualified for the 2012 Summer Olympics, held in London, where he reached the quarter-final but lost to Azeri World Champion Magomedrasul Majidov.

Career
Southpaw Omarov, as 19-year-old, grasped the gold medal at 2011 European Amateur Boxing Championships, held in Ankara, Turkey, in June 2011 by upsetting 2008 Olympic Champion Roberto Cammarelle.

Omarov was sent to the Olympics instead of world class local rival Sergei Kuzmin.
He qualified for the 2012 Summer Olympics at the European Qualifying Event, held in April 2012. In London he beat American Dominic Breazeale but ran into Azeri World Champion Magomedrasul Majidov and lost 14:17.

He won the title at the 2013 Summer Universiade. At the 2013 World Championships he beat two opponents but was again defeated by eventual champion Majidov.

See also
 Boxing at the 2012 Summer Olympics

References

External links
 Profile on AIBA

1989 births
Living people
Super-heavyweight boxers
Boxers at the 2012 Summer Olympics
Olympic boxers of Russia
People from Kaspiysk
Russian male boxers
Universiade medalists in boxing
Universiade gold medalists for Russia
Medalists at the 2013 Summer Universiade
Sportspeople from Dagestan